Kurumba, is a Southern Dravidian language of the Tamil–Kannada subgroup spoken by the Kurumba tribe. The Ethnologue classifies it as a separate language under Tamil-Kannada group.

Geographical distribution
Kurumba speakers are situated in Pudukkottai, Theni, Dindigul, Coimbatore, Dharmapuri, Krishnagiri, Vellore, and Salem districts of Tamil Nadu, in addition to areas of Karnataka and Andhra Pradesh.

References

Dravidian languages
Languages of Karnataka
Languages of Kerala